Ritika Mohan Singh is an Indian actress and former mixed martial artist, who predominantly appears in Tamil films in addition to Hindi Telugu and Malayalam Language films. After competing for India at the 2009 Asian Indoor Games and then participating in the Super Fight League, she played a leading role in Sudha Kongara Prasad's Tamil film Irudhi Suttru (also simultaneously shot in Hindi as Saala Khadoos) alongside R. Madhavan. She won Special Mention at the 63rd National Film Awards for her performance in the film. She received Filmfare Awards thrice for the same role in three languages: Tamil (Irudhi Suttru),  Hindi (Saala Khadoos)  and Telugu (Guru). She Has Won One National Award, One SIIMA Award, and Three Filmfare Award ( 2 Filmfare Award South & 1 Filmfare Award) Respectively.

Mixed martial arts career
Singh trained as a kickboxer and as a mixed martial artist since childhood, under the guidance of her father. She appeared in the inaugural season of the Super Fight League and competed as a mixed martial artist.

Mixed martial arts record

|-
| Loss
| align=center | 1–3
| Daizy Singh
| Decision (Unanimous)
| SFL 22-23
| 
| align=center | 3
| align=center | 5:00
| Mumbai, India
|
|-
| Loss
| align=center | 1–2
| Irene Cabello Rivera
| Submission (armbar)
| SFL 18
| 
| align=center | 1
| align=center | 2:06
| Mumbai, India
|
|-
| Win
| align=center | 1–1
| Aya Saber
| Decision (Unanimous)
| SFL 11
| 
| align=center | 3
| align=center | 5:00
| Mumbai, India
|
|-
| Loss
| align=center | 0–1
| Manjit Kolekar
| TKO (punches)
| SFL 5
| 
| align=center | 2
| align=center | 3:45
| Mumbai, India
|

Acting career
Ritika Singh began her acting career in 2013, she was spotted by director Sudha Kongara Prasad in an advert for the Super Fight League and she later auditioned to play a leading role in her bilingual film, Saala Khadoos (2016), after the makers managed to contact her through the competition's chairman, Raj Kundra. Portraying Madhi, a Marwari girl who grows up in the slums of Chennai, Singh was signed because the makers wanted a professional boxer to act, rather than an actress to act as a boxer. For the Tamil version, Irudhi Suttru, Singh phonetically learned her part in Tamil by writing down the dialogues in Hindi. Co-produced by the film's lead actor R. Madhavan and Rajkumar Hirani, the film was released in late January 2016. Ritika received rave reviews for her portrayal, with Sify.com stating "she is a marvelous discovery" and "her lip sync, body language and gait is a major highlight for the film". For her performance in Irudhi Suttru, Ritika won the a Special Mention at the 63rd National Film Awards, and became the first actress, who did not dub for her role, to be recognised at the National Awards. Singh later appeared in Manikandan's Aandavan Kattalai, which was released in September 2016. His next following was the Telugu movie Guru (2017), remake of Irudhi Suttru. Later, she performed in the horror comedy by P. Vasu's Shivalinga (2017) and Telugu movie Neevevaro (2018).

In 2020, she played the female protagonist in the film Oh My Kadavule with Ashok Selvan and Vani Bhojan.

Filmography

Films

Web series

Awards

References

External links

 

21st-century Indian actresses
21st-century Indian women
21st-century Indian people
Actresses from Mumbai
Actresses in Hindi cinema
Actresses in Tamil cinema
Actresses in Telugu cinema
Filmfare Awards winners
Indian female kickboxers
Indian female mixed martial artists
Female models from Mumbai
Indian film actresses
Living people
Martial artists from Mumbai
Sportswomen from Maharashtra
South Indian International Movie Awards winners
Special Mention (feature film) National Film Award winners
Zee Cine Awards winners
1994 births
Filmfare Awards South winners